The  is a statutory sign that is set up in the Road Traffic Law of Japan to indicate "aged person at the wheel".

The law decrees that when a person who is aged 70 and over drives a car and if their old age could affect the driving, they should endeavor to display this mark on both the front and rear of the car. Drivers aged 75 and over are obliged to display the mark.

Conversely, the green and yellow shoshinsha mark (also called wakaba mark) denotes new drivers. Both marks are designed to warn other drivers that the marked driver is not very skilled, either due to inexperience or old age.

Description

The system was instituted in 1997; until January 2011, its shape was an orange and yellow teardrop-shape, and it was accordingly also called .

As of 1 February 2011, the shape was changed to the new, four-leafed form.

Other uses
Outside Japan, owners of Japanese classic cars have adopted this symbol, regardless of the driver's age. Japanese car enthusiasts overseas also use the Koreisha mark to indicate that they are an experienced driver as opposed to the Wakaba mark which indicates that they are new or a learner type driver.

See also 
 L-plate
 Shoshinsha mark

References
 The Evolution of the JNC Stamp, March 15, 2010

Law of Japan
Road transport in Japan
Traffic law